Józef Zych (born 23 March 1938) is a Polish politician of the Polish People's Party. He was Sejm Marshal from 1995 to 1997 (and several times as Senior Marshall).

As a Sejm Marshal Zych administered the oath of office for the first term of President Aleksander Kwaśniewski in December 1995.

References

1938 births
Living people
People from Leżajsk County
Polish People's Party politicians
Marshals of the Sejm of the Third Polish Republic
Deputy Marshals of the Sejm of the Third Polish Republic
Members of the Polish Sejm 1991–1993
Members of the Polish Sejm 1993–1997
Members of the Polish Sejm 1997–2001
Members of the Polish Sejm 2001–2005
Members of the Polish Sejm 2005–2007
Members of the Polish Sejm 2007–2011
Members of the Polish Sejm 2011–2015